Mucronella pendula is a species of fungus in the family Clavariaceae. It was first described in 1901 by George Edward Massee as Myxomycidium pendulum and the holotype collection is from Tasmania. American mycologist Ron H. Petersen transferred it to Mucronella in 1980.

References

Clavariaceae
Fungi described in 1901
Fungi of Australia